Simeon Bellison (September 4, 1881 – May 4, 1953), born in Moscow, was a clarinetist and composer. He became a naturalised American after settling in the US in 1921. Bellison established an early clarinet choir (including women) in the United States; from an initial eight members, the group's size grew by 1948 to 75 members. Bellison was later the first clarinetist of the New York Philharmonic. The Philharmonic's online archive contains papers related to Bellison's leadership of his Philharmonic-sponsored clarinet ensemble, including various clarinets owned by the Philharmonic for the group's use, insurance policies, and sale of many of these in 1943.

Death
Bellison died in New York City in 1953.

References

 Recordings of the Mozart Clarinet Quintet, Concert Rondo and Beethoven's Don Giovanni Variations re-released on the Grenadillamusic.com label
 William G. King, The Philharmonic-Symphony Orchestra of New York, New York 1940
 Pamela Weston, More Clarinet Virtuosi of the Past, pp. 45–46, Fentone Music Limited 1982

1880s births
1953 deaths
Jews from the Russian Empire
American classical clarinetists
American people of Russian-Jewish descent
Soviet emigrants to the United States
20th-century classical musicians